Mouttagiaka ( []) is a village in the Limassol District of Cyprus, located east of Germasogeia. Prior to 1960, the village was almost exclusively inhabited by Turkish Cypriots.

References

 Communities in Limassol District
 Turkish Cypriot villages depopulated after the 1974 Turkish invasion of Cyprus